The relictual slender salamander (Batrachoseps relictus) is a species of salamander in the family Plethodontidae.
It is endemic to California, found only a small area in Kern County, California.

Distribution
This salamander's range is on Breckenridge Mountain located on the western slopes of the southern Sierra Nevada, east of the lower Kern River canyon in Kern County. Much of what was formerly known as the relictual slender salamander has now gone over to the Greenhorn Mountains slender salamander (Batrachoseps altasierrae), the Fairview slender salamander (Batrachoseps bramei) and the Kern Plateau slender salamander (Batrachoseps robustus).

Presently  relictual slender salamanders exist at only two sites on Breckenridge Mountain separated by a mere three miles. This locale is south and west of the range of the Kern Canyon slender salamander (Batrachoseps simatus). The species formerly existed to the west in the lower Kern River Canyon (the location of the type locality), but these populations have all gone extinct for unknown reasons. Further down the Kern River Canyon, the Gregarious slender salamander (Batrachoseps gregarius) occurs.

The relictual slender salamander's natural habitats are freshwater springs and riparian areas, interior chaparral and woodlands, and temperate coniferous forests.

References
   
 2012. Molecular and morphological diversification of slender salamanders (Caudata: Plethodontidae: Batrachoseps) in the southern Sierra Nevada with descriptions of two new species. Zootaxa 3190:1-30.

Batrachoseps
Salamander
Salamander
Salamander
Fauna of the California chaparral and woodlands
Salamander
Salamander
Extant Miocene first appearances
Taxonomy articles created by Polbot
Amphibians described in 1968